The United States census of 1940, conducted by the Census Bureau, determined the resident population of the United States to be 132,164,569, an increase of 7.6 percent over the 1930 population of 122,775,046 people. The census date of record was April 1, 1940.  

A number of new questions were asked including where people were five years before, highest educational grade achieved, and information about wages.  This census introduced sampling techniques; one in 20 people were asked additional questions on the census form.  Other innovations included a field test of the census in 1939. This was the first census in which every state (48) had a population greater than 100,000.

Census questions
The 1940 census collected the following information:

 address
 home owned or rented
 if owned, value
 if rented, monthly rent
 whether on a farm
 name
 relationship to head of household
 sex
 race
 age
 marital status
 school attendance
 educational attainment
 birthplace
 if foreign born, citizenship
 location of residence five years ago and whether on a farm
 employment status
 if at work, whether in private or non-emergency government work, or in public emergency work (WPA, CCC, NYA, etc.)
 if in private or non-emergency government work, hours worked in week
 if seeking work or on public emergency work, duration of unemployment
 occupation, industry and class of worker
 weeks worked last year
 wage and salary income last year

In addition, a sample of individuals were asked additional questions covering  age at first marriage,  fertility, and other topics.  Full documentation on the 1940 census, including census forms and a procedural history, is available from the Integrated Public Use Microdata Series.

Data availability

Following completion of the census, the original enumeration sheets were microfilmed; after which the original sheets were destroyed.

As required by Title 13 of the U.S. Code, access to personally identifiable information from census records was restricted for 72 years. Non-personally identifiable information Microdata from the 1940 census is freely available through the Integrated Public Use Microdata Series. Also, aggregate data for small areas, together with electronic boundary files, can be downloaded from the National Historical Geographic Information System.

On April 2, 2012—72 years after the census was taken—microfilmed images of the 1940 census enumeration sheets were released to the public by the National Archives and Records Administration. The records are indexed only by enumeration district upon initial release; several organizations are compiling indices, in some cases through crowdsourcing.

State rankings

City rankings

Use for Japanese American internment

During World War II, the Census Bureau responded to numerous information requests from US government agencies, including the US Army and the US Secret Service, to facilitate the internment of Japanese Americans. In his report of the operation,  U.S. Army Lt. Gen. John L. DeWitt wrote that "The most important single source of information prior to the evacuation was the 1940 Census of Population."

References

External links

 Official 1940 census website
 1940 Census Records from the U.S. National Archives and Records Administration
 1940 Federal Population Census Videos, training videos for enumerators at the U.S. National Archives
 Selected Historical Decennial Census Population and Housing Counts from the U.S. Census Bureau
 Snow, Michael S. (opinion) "Why the huge interest in the 1940 Census?" CNN. Monday April 9, 2012.
 1941 U.S Census Report Contains 1940 census results
 1940 Census Questions Hosted at CensusFinder.com.

United States Census, 1940
United States census
United States